Sunil Kumar Singh (born 1971) is a leading Indian geochemist, a former professor at the Physical Research Laboratory and currently the director of the National Institute of Oceanography, India. He is known for his studies on low temperature elemental and isotope geochemistry and his researches are reported to have assisted in widening the understanding of the evolution of the Himalayas. His studies have been documented in several peer-reviewed articles; Google Scholar, an online repository of scientific articles, has listed 99 of them respectively.

Singh, born on 16 March 1971, is a former Scientific Steering Committee member and the incumbent member of the Data Management Committee of GEOTRACES, an international forum for research on the marine biogeochemical cycles of trace elements and isotopes. As a collaborator, he is associated with the Ganga Corridor program, an initiative of the Indian Institute of Technology, Kanpur and the Department of Science and Technology, India. He was the co-coordinator of Weathering and Erosion session of the 2016 Goldschmidt conference held in Yokohama. He is a recipient of the National Geoscience Award and an elected fellow of the Indian Academy of Sciences, the National Academy of Sciences, India , and the Indian National Science Academy. The Council of Scientific and Industrial Research, the apex agency of the Government of India for scientific research, awarded him the Shanti Swarup Bhatnagar Prize for Science and Technology, one of the highest Indian science awards for his contributions to Earth, Atmosphere, Ocean and Planetary Sciences in 2016.

Selected bibliography

See also 
 Isotope geochemistry

Notes

References

External links 
 

Recipients of the Shanti Swarup Bhatnagar Award in Earth, Atmosphere, Ocean & Planetary Sciences
1971 births
Indian scientific authors
Scientists from Ahmedabad
Indian geochemists
Living people
Fellows of the Indian Academy of Sciences